= Nasejje Jalia =

Ugandan gospel musician

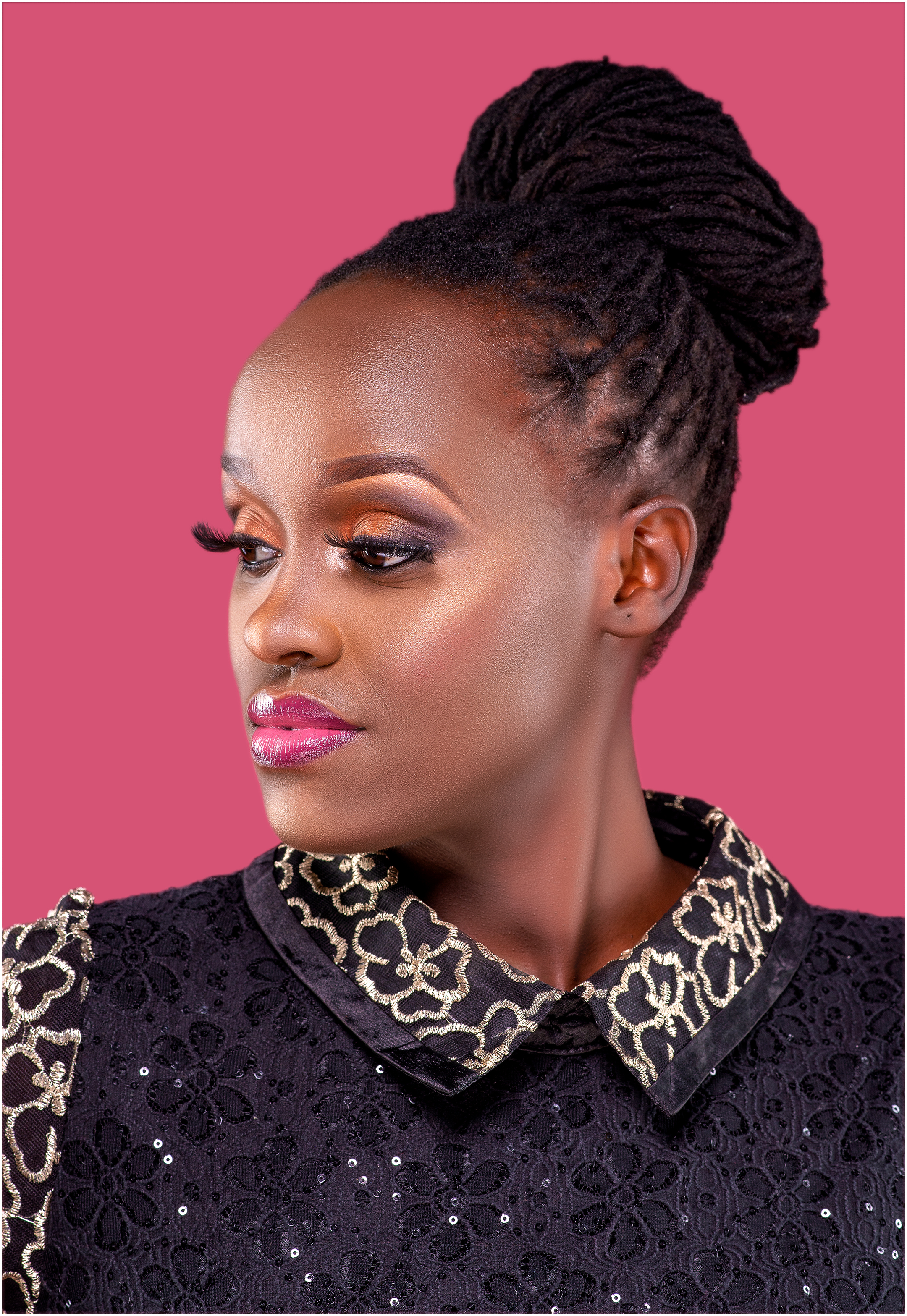

Background information
- Also known as: Zabuli
- Born: 29 February 1992 (age 34); Entebbe, Uganda
- Genres: Gospel music, dancehall
- Occupation: Musician
- Years active: 2013–present

Nasejje Jalia (born 29 February 1992), known professionally as Zabuli, is a Ugandan gospel and dancehall musician. She has received recognition at Uganda's VIGA Awards and founded the Can You Praise talent-search programme for Christian musicians.

== Early life ==
Jalia was born in Entebbe and was the third of five children. Her mother was Christian and her father was Muslim. She studied education at university and graduated in 2015.

== Career ==
Jalia began writing music after the death of her father in 2012. Her debut song, "Take the Wheel", reflected her return to Christianity, and she began performing under the name Zabuli. Her releases include the album Mwana wa Muloodi (2017) and Roza (2020).

In 2019, Jalia established Can You Praise, a talent-search and mentoring programme for Christian singers and rappers. Its second season was launched in 2022 with a cash prize for the winner.

== Awards ==
At the 2016 VIGA Awards, Jalia won Female Artist of the Year and a collaboration award. She was also nominated for Female Artist of the Year at the 2017–18 VIGA Awards.
